The Raid on Mubo was a raid by Australian commandos on the Japanese base at Mubo in New Guinea in World War II conducted on 1 October 1942. A party of 60 soldiers from the 2/5th Commando Squadron (Australia) under Norman Winning attacked the Japanese base. It was estimated up to 50 Japanese were killed.

References

Further reading
 
 

Mubo
1942 in Papua New Guinea
Mubo
Mubo
South West Pacific theatre of World War II
October 1942 events